The 2022–23 WHL season is the 57th season of the Western Hockey League (WHL). The regular season started on September 23, 2022, and will end on March 26, 2023.  The 2023 WHL Playoffs will begin on March 31, 2023 and run until mid-May 2023. Teams went back to inter-conference games for first time since the 2019–20 season.

Standings

Conference standings 

x – team has clinched playoff spot

y – team has clinched division

z – team has clinched best regular season record

e – team is eliminated from playoff contention

Statistical leaders

Scoring leaders 
Players are listed by points, then goals.

Note: GP = Games played; G = Goals; A = Assists; Pts. = Points; PIM = Penalty minutes

Goaltenders 
These are the goaltenders that lead the league in GAA that have played at least 1,080 minutes.

Note: GP = Games played; Mins = Minutes played; W = Wins; L = Losses; OTL = Overtime losses; SOL = Shootout losses; SO = Shutouts; GAA = Goals against average; Sv% = Save percentage

2023 WHL Playoffs

WHL awards

See also 
 List of WHL seasons
 2023 Memorial Cup
 2022–23 OHL season
 2022–23 QMJHL season

References

External links 

 Official website of the Western Hockey League
 Official website of the Canadian Hockey League

Western Hockey League seasons
Whl
WHL